Chongyi County is a county under the jurisdiction of Ganzhou Municipality, in the southwest of Jiangxi province, China.

Statistics

Administration
The county executive, legislature, judiciary are at Hengshui Town, together with the CPC and PSB branches.

Chongyi County is divided to 5 towns and 10 townships.
5 Towns

10 Townships

Economy
Mining of uranium is carried out in the region.

Climate

References

External links
Brief Introduction of Chongyi, Chongyi Government website, (Chinese)

Ganzhou
County-level divisions of Jiangxi